Debility can refer to:
 Debility (medical)
 Debility (astrology)